TakaokaDam  is a gravity dam located in Miyazaki Prefecture in Japan. The dam is used for power production. The catchment area of the dam is 1373.6 km2. The dam impounds about 96  ha of land when full and can store 12464 thousand cubic meters of water. The construction of the dam was started on 1926 and completed in 1931.

See also
List of dams in Japan

References

Dams in Miyazaki Prefecture